Lachlan Russell is a former professional rugby league footballer who played in the 2000s for the St. George Illawarra Dragons.

Playing career
Russell made his first grade debut for St. George Illawarra in round 10 of the 2004 NRL season against Canterbury-Bankstown at WIN Stadium with the match finishing in a 38-12 loss.  This was Russell's one and only game in the top grade.

In 2009, Russell played for the Dapto Canaries in the Illawarra rugby league competition.

References

Australian rugby league players
Sunnybank Rugby players
Rugby league halfbacks
St. George Illawarra Dragons players
Living people
1984 births
Place of birth missing (living people)